An indirect presidential election was held in Suriname on 19 July 2010 following the legislative election. If the National Assembly of Suriname twice fails to elect a new president with a two-thirds majority, the election will go to the People's Assembly of Suriname, composed of members of parliament, district and provincial councils, where a simple majority suffices.

A first vote was expected on 8 July 2010, but only procedural issues were discussed at the meeting; the election was set for 19 July 2010 on the following day.

Shortly before the election, former dictator Dési Bouterse succeeded in establishing a coalition with the A Combinatie and the People's Alliance, giving him the votes required for the presidential election. As expected, he gained 36 votes against Chan Santokhi's 13 votes; he was sworn in on 12 August 2010.

References

2010
2010 elections in South America
2010 in Suriname